Viski may refer to:

 Erzsébet Viski, Hungarian sprint canoer
 János Viski, Hungarian composer, pianist and teacher
 Dve Viski, rural locality in Pokhodsky Rural Okrug of Nizhnekolymsky District in the Sakha Republic, Russia

See also 

 Višķi (disambiguation)